Sulfaquinoxaline (IUPAC name: 4-Amino-N-2-quinoxalinylbenzenesulfonamide) is a veterinary medicine which can be given to cattle and sheep to treat coccidiosis. It is available in Pakistan with Sanna Laboratories in combination with Amprolium and Vitamin K as potential treatment of coccidiosis.

References

Veterinary drugs
Sulfonamide antibiotics
Quinoxalines